Matilde Ortiz Reyes (born 16 September 1990 in Veracruz, Mexico) is a Spanish female water polo player of Mexican descent. At the 2012 Summer Olympics, she won a silver medal competing for the Spain women's national water polo team in the women's event. She also competed for Spain at the 2016 Summer Olympics.  She is 5 ft 8.5 inches tall. She plays for the Spanish club CN Sabadell, and is studying journalism at the Autonomous University of Barcelona.

See also
 List of Olympic medalists in water polo (women)
 List of world champions in women's water polo
 List of World Aquatics Championships medalists in water polo

References

External links
 

1990 births
Living people
Sportspeople from Veracruz
Spanish female water polo players
Water polo centre backs
Water polo players at the 2012 Summer Olympics
Water polo players at the 2016 Summer Olympics
Medalists at the 2012 Summer Olympics
Olympic silver medalists for Spain in water polo
World Aquatics Championships medalists in water polo
Autonomous University of Barcelona alumni
21st-century Spanish women
Naturalised citizens of Spain
Mexican emigrants to Spain
Sportswomen from Catalonia
Water polo players from Catalonia